Binayak is a small town in Achham District in the Seti Zone of western Nepal. According to the 1991 Nepal census, the village had a population of 4270 living in 831 houses. At the time of the 2001 Nepal census, the population was 4881, of which 30% was literate.

References

Populated places in Achham District
Village development committees in Achham District